Hillerse is a municipality in the district of Gifhorn, in Lower Saxony, Germany. It is a member municipality of the Samtgemeinde Meinersen. The Municipality Hillerse includes the villages of Hillerse and Volkse.

Twin towns
Hillerse is twinned with Bréville-les-Monts  and Amfreville both in Calvados in France, and with Dolton in Devon in the UK.

References

Gifhorn (district)